Uniformity  may refer to:

 Distribution uniformity, a measure of how uniformly water is applied to the area being watered
 Religious uniformity, the promotion of one state religion, denomination, or philosophy to the exclusion of all other religious beliefs
 Retention uniformity, a concept in thin layer chromatography
 Tire uniformity, a concept in vehicle technology
 Uniformity (chemistry), a measure of the homogeneity of a substance's composition or character
 Uniformity (complexity), a concept in computational complexity theory
 Uniformity (philosophy), the concept that the same natural laws and processes that operate in the universe now have always operated in the universe
 Uniformity (topology), a concept in the mathematical field of topology
 Uniformity of motive, a concept in astrobiology

See also
 Uniform (disambiguation)
 Diversity (disambiguation)